The following is a list of the 33 municipalities (comuni) of the Province of Terni, Umbria, Italy.

List

See also
List of municipalities of Italy

References

Terni